Jasem Ali (Arabic:جاسم علي) (born 2 May 1986) is an Emirati footballer who played as a defensive midfielder for Ajman .

Career
He played throughout his history at Ajman Club until his retirement.

References

External links
 

1986 births
Living people
Emirati footballers
Ajman Club players
UAE Pro League players
UAE First Division League players
Association football midfielders
Place of birth missing (living people)